The 1996 World Ringette Championship (1996 WRC) was an international ringette tournament and the 4th (IX) World Ringette Championships. The tournament was organized by the International Ringette Federation (IRF) and was contested in Stockholm, Sweden, from April 15 to 20, 1996. WRC 1996 was the first time all competing teams represented individual nations with Canada creating its first, singular, all-Canadian team.

Overview
Team Canada won the gold medal beating Team Finland 6–5 in extra time. Team Canada took home the gold and the Sam Jacks Trophy, the first year the updated design of the trophy was awarded.

Venue
The tournament was contested in Stockholm, Sweden.

Teams

Final standings

Rosters

Team Finland
The 1996 Team Finland Senior team competed at the 1996 WRC.

Team Canada
The 1996 Team Canada Senior team became Canada's first official national ringette team and competed in the 1996 World Ringette Championships. It was the first time Canada sent only one ringette team to represent the nation and was technically the first Team Canada in ringette history.

The 1996 Team Canada team included the following:

See also
 World Ringette Championships
 International Ringette Federation
  Canada national ringette team
  Finland national ringette team
  Sweden national ringette team
  United States national ringette team

References

World Ringette Championships
Ringette
Ringette competitions